Duboisialestes is a genus of African tetras found in the Democratic Republic of Congo and the Republic of Congo.  There are currently two described species in this genus.

Species
 Duboisialestes bifasciatus Poll, 1967
 Duboisialestes tumbensis (Hoedeman, 1951)

References
 

Alestidae
Fish of Africa